Ruby Pearl Elzy (February 20, 1908 – June 26, 1943) was an American operatic soprano. She appeared on stage and in films. She recorded on albums before her death in her 30s from surgery to remove a benign tumor.

Family and early life
Elzy was born in Pontotoc, Mississippi, and educated at Rust College, the Ohio State University (graduating in 1930) and the Juilliard School (graduating in 1934). At Juilliard she was a pupil of Lucia Dunham. Her sister Amanda Elzy (died 2004) was a prominent educator after whom Amanda Elzy High School in Greenwood, Mississippi is named. Their mother Emma Elzy (died 1985, aged 98) was a teacher and prominent member of the Methodist church, in whose memory the Mississippi Conference of the United Methodist Church presents an annual Emma K. Elzy award.  Ruby had two sisters, Amanda and Beatrice Wayne and one brother, Robert.  Their father Charlie abandoned the family when Ruby was five.

Professional accomplishments
Elzy entertained at the White House, December 15, 1937, for First Lady Eleanor Roosevelt's luncheon for the wives of U.S. Supreme Court Justices. She appeared on Broadway in the musical John Henry, in films, on radio and on the concert stage. She appeared with Paul Robeson in the 1933 film The Emperor Jones, and also with Bing Crosby and Mary Martin in Birth of the Blues, though neither of these were starring roles. She sang at Harlem's Apollo Theater and in the Hollywood Bowl.

Elzy created the role of Serena in George Gershwin's folk opera Porgy and Bess and performed in it more than eight hundred times.  Serena sings the heart-wrenching  soprano aria and lament "My Man's Gone Now" after her husband Robbin is murdered in a crap game. But fellow cast member and lead soprano Anne Brown (who occupied the role of  Bess) and not Elzy is actually heard singing the aria on the 1940 original cast album of selections from Porgy and Bess. Fortunately, Elzy sang the demanding aria on the 1937 CD release of the Gershwin Memorial Concert that took place  three months after the composer's death at the Hollywood Bowl.

Legacy
In 1940, she was chosen by composer Harold Arlen to record the world premiere of his original suite of Negro spirituals, "Reverend Johnson's Dream", which would be her only commercial recording. During the same year Ruby married Jack Carr, an actor/singer who appeared on stage with her in "Porgy and Bess".  The marriage lasted until her death.

Elzy rose above poverty and prejudice to become one of the most acclaimed singers of her generation, but her career lasted barely a decade. Just as she was reaching the peak of her powers as a singer and about to achieve her greatest dream—to star in the title role of Giuseppe Verdi's Aida—and one week after her final performance as Serena, Ruby Elzy died in Detroit following surgery to remove a benign tumor.  She was 35 years old.

In 2006, Elzy's biographer, David E. Weaver, produced a first-ever CD compilation of Elzy, featuring the singer in twenty rare recorded and broadcast performances. The CD, entitled Ruby Elzy in Song, was released on the Cambria label.

Selected filmography
The Emperor Jones (1933) as Dolly
Birth of the Blues (1941)

References

 David E. Weaver, Black Diva of the Thirties: The Life of Ruby Elzy, University Press of Mississippi, September 2004.
 "The Sweet Sound of Ruby Elzy", review of CD Ruby Elzy in Song by Pulitzer Prize-winning critic Lloyd Schwartz on NPR's Fresh Air, broadcast 28 June 2007:

External links

1908 births
1943 deaths
People from Pontotoc, Mississippi
20th-century African-American women singers
20th-century American women opera singers
African-American women opera singers
American operatic sopranos
Singers from Mississippi
Ohio State University alumni
Rust College alumni
Juilliard School alumni
Deaths from cancer in Michigan
Classical musicians from Mississippi